Bundism was a secular Jewish socialist movement whose organizational manifestation was the General Jewish Labour Bund in Lithuania, Belarus, Poland, and Russia, founded in the Russian Empire in 1897.

The Jewish Labour Bund was an important component of the social democratic movement in the Russian empire until the 1917 Russian Revolution; the Bundists initially opposed the October Revolution, but ended up supporting it due to pogroms committed by the Volunteer Army of the anti-communist White movement during the Russian Civil War. Split along communist and social democratic lines throughout the Civil War, a faction supported the Soviet government and eventually was absorbed by the Communist Party.

Bundist movement continued to exist as a political party in independent Poland in the interwar period as the General Jewish Labour Bund in Poland, becoming a major, if not the major, political force within Polish Jewry. Bundists were active in the anti-Nazi struggle, and many of its members were murdered during the Holocaust.

After the war, the International Jewish Labor Bund, more properly the "World Coordinating Council of the Jewish Labor Bund", was founded in New York, with affiliated groups in Argentina, Australia, Canada, France, Israel, Mexico, the United Kingdom, the United States, and other countries.

Though extant after the war and undergoing a revival in the 21st century, according to Dr. David Kranzler, the movement and its relatives (eg the Gordonia youth movement) were relatively unsuccessful in accomplishing their goals in Europe, though they were popular.

Ideology

Marxism 
While the Jewish Labour Bund was a trade union as well as a political party, its initial purpose was the organisation of the Jewish proletariat in Belarus, Russia, Poland and Lithuania.

Secularism 
A staunchly secular party, the Jewish Labour Bund took part in kehillot elections in Poland. The Bundists reviled the religious Jews of the time, even going so far as to refer to Yeshiva students - who would live in poverty off of charity and learn Torah, instead of work - as "parasites."

Yiddishism 
The Jewish Labour Bund, while not initially interested in Yiddish per se as anything more than a vehicle to exhort the masses of Jewish workers in Eastern Europe, soon saw the language and the larger Yiddish culture as a value and promoted the use of Yiddish as a Jewish national language in its own right; to some extent, the promotion of Yiddish was part and parcel of the Bund's opposition to the Zionist movement, and its project of reviving Hebrew.

Doikayt 
The concept of Doikayt (from דאָ do 'here' plus ־יק -ik adjectival suffix plus ־קייט -kayt '-ness' suffix), was central to the Bundist ideology, expressing its focus on solving the challenges confronting Jews in the country in which they lived, versus the "thereness" of the Zionist movement, which posited the necessity of an independent Jewish polity in its ancestral homeland, i.e., the Land of Israel, to secure Jewish life.

National-cultural autonomism 
The Jewish Labour Bund did not advocate ethnic or religious separatism, but focused on culture, not a state or a place, as the glue of Jewish nationhood, within the context of a world of multi-cultural and multi-ethnic countries. In this the Bundists borrowed extensively from the Austro-Marxist concept of national personal autonomy; this approach alienated the Bolsheviks and Lenin, who was derisive of and politically opposed to Bundism.

In a 1904 text, Social democracy and the national question, Vladimir Medem exposed his version of this concept:
"Let us consider the case of a country composed of several national groups, e.g. Poles, Lithuanians and Jews. Each national group would create a separate movement. All citizens belonging to a given national group would join a special organisation that would hold cultural assemblies in each region and a general cultural assembly for the whole country. The assemblies would be given financial powers of their own: either each national group would be entitled to raise taxes on its members, or the state would allocate a proportion of its overall budget to each of them. Every citizen of the state would belong to one of the national groups, but the question of which national movement to join would be a matter of personal choice and no authority would have any control over his decision. The national movements would be subject to the general legislation of the state, but in their own areas of responsibility they would be autonomous and none of them would have the right to interfere in the affairs of the others".

Opposition to Zionism

Before the creation of the State of Israel 
The Jewish Labour Bund, as an organization, was formed at the same time as the World Zionist Organization. The Bund eventually came to strongly oppose Zionism, arguing that immigration to Palestine was a form of escapism. After the 1936 Warsaw kehilla elections, Henryk Ehrlich accused Zionist leaders Yitzhak Gruenbaum and Ze'ev Jabotinsky of being responsible for recent anti-Semitic agitation in Poland by their campaign urging Jewish emigration.

After 1947 
The Bund was against the UNGA vote on the partition of Palestine and reaffirmed its support for a country under the control of superpowers and the UN. The 1948 New York Second World Conference of the International Jewish Labor Bund condemned the proclamation of the Zionist state. The conference was in favour of a two nations’ state built on the base of national equality and democratic federalism.

A branch of the Jewish Labour Bund was created in Israel in 1951, the Arbeter-ring in Yisroel – Brith Haavoda, which even took part in the 1959 Knesset elections, with a very low electoral result. Its publication, Lebns Fregyn, is still being published as of 2014. It is one of the relatively few left-wing Yiddish-language publications in existence.

The 1955 Montreal 3rd World Conference of the International Jewish Labor Bund decided that the creation of the Jewish state was an important event in Jewish history that might play a positive role in Jewish life, but felt that a few necessary changes were needed. The conference participants demanded that:
a) the authorities of Israel should treat the state as property of the Jews of the world;
b) but it would mean that the affairs of the Jewish community in Israel should be subordinate to those of world Jewry.
c) the policy of the state of Israel would be the same toward all citizens regardless of their nationalities.
d) Israel should foster peace with the Arabs. This required halting territorial expansion and resolving the Palestinian refugee problem.
e) Yiddish should be taught at all educational institutions and would be promoted in public life.

The World Coordinating Council of the Jewish Labour Bund was quietly disbanded by a number of Bundists and representatives of related organizations, including the Workmen's Circle and the Congress for Jewish Culture in the early 2000s.

The London-based Jewish Socialists' Group, which publishes the magazine Jewish Socialist, considers itself an heir of the historic Jewish Labour Bund.
Furthermore, the early 21st-century has witnessed a revival in the ideas of the Bund (sometimes called "neo-Bundism").

Bundist members of parliaments or governments 
 Moshe Gutman, member of the Central Council of Ukraine in 1917, then minister without portfolio in the short-lived autonomous Belarusian National Council (1917–1918) and Belarusian People's Republic (1918–1919)
 Noah Meisel (1891–1956) member of the Saeima between 1922 and 1931 (twice reelected); Daugavpils city council member
 Moisei Rafes (1883–1942), member of the 1917 Russian Constituent Assembly and also of the Central Council of Ukraine; member, as General controller, of the General Secretariat of Ukraine (the chief executive body of the Ukrainian People's Republic from 28 June 1917 to 22 January 1918)
 Aleksandr Zolotarev, successor of Moisei Rafes
 Szmul Zygielbojm (1895–1943), member of the National Council of the Polish government-in-exile (March 1942 until his suicide in May, 1943)
 Emanuel Scherer, member of the National Council of the Polish government-in-exile after Szmul Zygielbojm's suicide; secretary general of the International Jewish Labor Bund (1961–1977)
 Michal Shuldenfrei, member of the Sejm in 1947-1948

See also 
 Jewish Social Democratic Workers Association "Zukunft"

References

Further reading

In English 
 Yosef Gorni, Converging alternatives: the Bund and the Zionist Labor Movement, 1897-1985, SUNY Press, 2006, 
 Jonathan Frankel, Jewish politics and the Russian Revolution of 1905, Tel-Aviv, Tel Aviv University, 1982 (21 pages)
 Jonathan Frankel, Prophecy and politics: socialism, nationalism, and the Russian Jews, 1862-1917, Cambridge University Press, 1984, 
 Jack Lester Jacobs (ed.), Jewish Politics in Eastern Europe : The Bund at 100, Zydowski Instytut Historyczny—Instytut Naukowo-Badawczy, New York, New York University Press, May 2001, 
 Jack Lester Jacobs, Bundist Counterculture in Interwar Poland, Syracuse University Press, 2009, 
 Bernard K. Johnpoll, The politics of futility. The General Jewish Workers Bund of Poland, 1917–1943, Ithaca, New York, Cornell University Press, 1967
 N. Levin, While Messiah tarried : Jewish socialist movements, 1871–1917, New York, Schocken Books, 1977, 
 N. Levin, Jewish socialist movements, 1871–1917 : while Messiah tarried, London, Routledge & K. Paul (Distributed by Oxford University Press), 1978, 
 Y. Peled, Class and ethnicity in the pale: the political economy of Jewish workers' nationalism in late Imperial Russia, New York, St. Martin's Press, 1989, 
 Antony Polonsky, "The Bund in Polish Political Life, 1935-1939", in: Ezra Mendelsohn (ed.), Essential Papers on Jews and the Left, New York, New York University Press, 1997
 C. Belazel Sherman, Bund, Galuth nationalism, Yiddishism, Herzl Institute Pamphlet no.6, New York, 1958, ASIN B0006AVR6U
 Henry Tobias, The origins and evolution of the Jewish Bund until 1901, Ann Arbor (Michigan), University Microfilms, 1958
 Henry Tobias, The Jewish Bund in Russia from Its Origins to 1905, Stanford, Stanford University Press, 1972
 Enzo Traverso, From Moses to Marx - The Marxists and the Jewish question: History of a debate 1843-1943, New Jersey, Humanities Press, 1996 (review)
 A.K. Wildman, Russian and Jewish social democracy, Bloomington, Indiana University Press, 1973

Documents
 "The resolution of the tenth conference of the Bund, April 1917"

In French 
 Daniel Blatman, Notre liberté et La Vôtre - Le Mouvement ouvrier juif Bund en Pologne, 1939-1949, 2002,  (French review)
 Alain Brossat, Le Yiddishland révolutionnaire, Paris, Balland, 1983 
 Élie Eberlin, Juifs russes : le Bund et le sionisme. Un voyage d'étude., Paris, Cahiers de la quinzaine (6e cahier de la 6e série), 1904, 155 pages ASIN B001C9XEME
 Vladimir Medem, Ma vie, Paris, Champion, 1969 (Memories of a Bund leader)
 Henri Minczeles, "La résistance du Bund en France pendant l'occupation", Le Monde juif 51:154 (1995) : 138-53
 Henri Minczeles, Histoire générale du Bund, Un mouvement révolutionnaire juif, Éditions Denoël, Paris, 1999, 
 Claudie Weill, Les cosmopolites - Socialisme et judéité en Russie (1897–1917), Paris, Éditions Syllpse, Collection "Utopie critique", févr. 2004,  (presentation)
 Enzo Traverso, De Moïse à Marx - Les marxistes et la question juive, Paris, Kimé, 1997
 Union progressiste des Juifs de Belgique, 100 anniversaire du Bund. Actes du Colloque, Minorités, Démocratie, Diasporas, Bruxelles, UPJB, 1997, 
 Nathan Weinstock, Le Pain de misère, Histoire du mouvement ouvrier juif en Europe - L'empire russe jusqu'en 1914, Paris, La Découverte, 2002, (Vol. I) 
 Nathan Weinstock, Le Pain de misère, Histoire du mouvement ouvrier juif en Europe - L'Europe centrale et occidentale jusqu'en 1945, Paris, La Découverte, (Vol. II) 
 movie: Nat Lilenstein (Dir.), Les Révolutionnaires du Yiddishland, 1983, Kuiv productions & A2 (French review)

In German 
 Arye Gelbard, Der jüdische Arbeiter-Bund Russlands im Revolutionsjahr 1917, Wien : Europaverlag, 1982 (Materialien zur Arbeiterbewegung ; Nr. 26), 
 Gertrud Pickhan, "Gegen den Strom". Der Allgemeine Jüdische Arbeiterbund, "Bund" in Polen, 1918-1939, Stuttgart/Munich, DVA, 2001, 445 p. (Schriftenreihe des Simon-Dubnow-Instituts, Leipzig),  (French review)

 
Jewish movements
Jewish socialism
Socialism